Edward Clarence "Ed" Kent (September 19, 1859 – December 12, 1943) was a Major League Baseball pitcher who played from  with the Toledo Blue Stockings. He batted and threw right-handed.

Kent was born in 1859 in Stockport, New York, and died in Rutherford, New Jersey at the age of 84.

External links

1859 births
Major League Baseball pitchers
Baseball players from New York (state)
Toledo Blue Stockings players
1943 deaths
19th-century baseball players
New Bedford (minor league baseball) players
Peoria Reds players
Guelph Maple Leafs players
Omaha Omahogs players
Keokuk Hawkeyes players
Chattanooga Lookouts players
Birmingham Ironmakers players
Binghamton Crickets (1880s) players